Valencian Media Corporation (in Valencian, Corporació Valenciana de Mitjans de Comunicació, and in Spanish, Corporación Valenciana de Medios de Comunicación), also known by its acronyms CVMC or VMC, is an agency of the Generalitat Valenciana, although with management autonomy and functional independence, in charge of producing and disseminating audiovisual products. Since 20 July 2016 is the successor of Radiotelevisió Valenciana, which was closed in 2013 by the ex-president Alberto Fabra by considering unaffordable the cost of staff readmission after justice considered illegal the layoff.

It is part of the Federation of Regional Organizations of Radio and Television (FORTA) with which it shares content for broadcast on different regions.

Corporate identity

Logos

Activities

Television

Channels

Radio

Stations

See also 
 Radiotelevisió Valenciana

References

External links 
 .

Mass media in the Valencian Community
FORTA
Television networks in Spain
Publicly funded broadcasters
Mass media companies established in 2016
Television channels and stations established in 2016
2016 establishments in the Valencian Community